Collegium Musicum was one of several types of musical societies in German and German-Swiss cities and towns.

Collegium Musicum may also refer to:

 Collegium Musicum (band), a Slovak art rock band
 Collegium Musicum de Caracas, a Venezuelan musical group (1964-1976)
 Collegium Musicum 90, an English baroque orchestra
 Collegium Musicum Den Haag, a baroque orchestra
 Collegium Musicum de Paris, a chamber orchestra founded by Roland Douatte
 Harvard–Radcliffe Collegium Musicum, a mixed chorus at Harvard University